Chernelytsia is an urban-type settlement in Kolomyia Raion in Ivano-Frankivsk Oblast. It hosts the administration of Chernelytsia settlement hromada, one of the hromadas of Ukraine.

Location 
Chernelytsia is located south of the Dniester on the Dolzhok River.

History 
Between 1772 and 1918 it was part of Austrian Galicia. After the end of World War I Chernelytsia became part of  Horodenka Powiat in Stanisławów Voivodeship, part of Poland. In 1939 it was annexed by the Soviet Union. In 1940 it became an urban-type settlement.

Chernelytsia was occupied by German troops during World War II from 1941 to 1944, part of the District of Galicia.

Until 18 July 2020, Chernelytsia belonged to Horodenka Raion. The raion was abolished in July 2020 as part of the administrative reform of Ukraine, which reduced the number of raions of Ivano-Frankivsk Oblast to six. The area of Horodenka Raion was merged into Kolomyia Raion.

References 

Urban-type settlements in Kolomyia Raion